This is a list of rock formations in the Harz. They are known as the Harzklippen (literally "Harz crags" or "Harz cliffs") in German, which is the collective name for the, mainly, granite rock outcrops, crags and tors in the Harz mountains of Germany. Most of them have the status of a natural monument.

The following list contains an alphabetically-sorted selection of rock formations in the Harz with - where known - their height in metres (m) above sea level, referenced to Normalnull (NN):
 Achtermannstor (max. c. 900 m), on the Achtermannshöhe, near Braunlage, Lower Saxony
 Ackertklippe, near Königshütte, Saxony-Anhalt
 Adlerklippen (max. c. 340 m), in the valley of the Oker, near Goslar-Oker, Lower Saxony
 Adlersklippen (see below: Teufelsmauer)
 Ahrentsklint (Ahrentsklintklippe; max. 822.4 m), on the Erdbeerkopf, near Schierke, Saxony-Anhalt
 Altarklippen (max. c. 490 m), on the Heimberg, near Lautenthal, Lower Saxony
 Anhaltinischer Saalstein (max. c. 393 m), in the valley of the Kältetalbach, near Bad Suderode, Saxony-Anhalt
 Bärenklippe (near c. 870 m), part of the Hohneklippen of the Hohnekamm, between Wernigerode and Schierke, Saxony-Anhalt
 Bäumlersklippe (near c. 350 m), on the Meineberg, near Ilsenburg, Saxony-Anhalt
 Bielsteinsklippe (near c. 385 m), on the Bielstein, near Hüttenrode, Saxony-Anhalt
 Böser Kleef, near Altenbrak, Saxony-Anhalt
 Bremer Klippe (near c. 550 m), on the Jagdkopf, near Wieda, Lower Saxony
 Breitesteinklippen (near. c. 840 m), on the Achtermannshöhe, near Torfhaus, Lower Saxony
 Brockenkinderklippe (near c. 905 m), on the Renneckenberg, between Wernigerode and Schierke, Saxony-Anhalt
 Brockentor (max. 1,039.5 m), on the Heinrichshöhe, between Wernigerode and Schierke, Saxony-Anhalt
 Dreibrodesteine (near c. 641 m), near Sankt Andreasberg, Lower Saxony
 Dühringsklippe, on the Netzberg, near Netzkater, Thuringia
 Elfenstein (max. c. 420 m), on the Elfenstein, near Bad Harzburg, Lower Saxony
 Elversstein (max. c. 499 m), on the Steinberg, near Hasserode, Saxony-Anhalt
 Ettersklippe (near c. 440 m), on the Ettersberg, near Bad Harzburg, Lower Saxony
 Falkenklippe (max. 405.2 m), in the Bodetal, between Altenbrak and Treseburg, Saxony-Anhalt
 Feigenbaumklippe (auch: Feigenbaumkanzel; near c. 540 m), on the Huthberg, between Oker and Schulenberg, Lower Saxony
 Ferdinandsstein (near c. 639 m), near Ilsenburg, Saxony-Anhalt
 Feuersteinklippe (near c. 710 m), near Schierke station, Saxony-Anhalt
 Geroldsklippen (max. c. 390 m), in the valley of the Wurmbach, near Stecklenberg, Saxony-Anhalt
 Gewitterklippen (max. c. 410 m), in the Bodetal, between Thale and Treseburg, Saxony-Anhalt
 Gipfelklippe (max. 1,033.5 m), on the Königsberg, between Ilsenburg and Schierke, Saxony-Anhalt
 Glückaufklippen (max. c. 670 m), on the Kuppe, near Sankt Andreasberg, Lower Saxony
 Goldenkerklippe (max. c. 840 m), Auf dem Acker, Lower Saxony
 Grenzklippe (near c. 886 m), part of the Hohneklippen of the Hohnekamm, between Wernigerode and Schierke, Saxony-Anhalt
 Große Teufelsmühle (max. c. 581 m), on the Viktorshöhe, near Friedrichsbrunn, Saxony-Anhalt
 Große Wurmbergklippe (auch: Große Klippe; max. 823.8 m) (see below: Wurmbergklippen)
 Große Zeterklippe (Obere Zeterklippe; max. 929.7 m), see below: Zeterklippen
 Hahnenkleeklippen (max. c. 750 m), east of the Odertals, near Braunlage, Lower Saxony
 Hohnekammsteinklippen (max. c. 780 m), Auf dem Acker, Lower Saxony
 Hanskühnenburgfelsen (near c. 815 m), on the Hanskühnenburg, Auf dem Acker, Lower Saxony
 Hanskühnenburgklippe (near c. 818 m), near the Hanskühnenburg, Auf dem Acker, Lower Saxony
 Harschenhöllenklippe (near / max. 411 m, on the Halberstädter Berg, near Oehrenfeld, Saxony-Anhalt
 Hausmannsklippen (max. c. 480 m), on the Kaltetalskopf, near Bad Harzburg, Lower Saxony
 Hexenküche (near c. 570 m), on the Huthberg, between Oker and Schulenberg, Lower Saxony
 Hirschhornklippen (near 1,023.2 m), on the Königsberg, between Wernigerode and Schierke, Saxony-Anhalt
 Hohe Klippen (max. c. 770 m), west of the Odertals, near Sankt Andreasberg, Lower Saxony
 Hoher Kleef (max. c. 306 m), near Rübeland, Saxony-Anhalt
 Hopfensäcke (max. c. 875 m), on the Quitschenberg, near Torfhaus, Lower Saxony
 Ifenkopfer Klippe (max. c. 620 m), on the Ifenkopf, between Altenau and Kon theschlacken, Lower Saxony
 Ilsestein (max. 473.2 m), near Ilsenburg, Saxony-Anhalt
 Jungfernklippe (max. c. 390 m), on the Kleiner Staufenberg, near Zorge, Lower Saxony
 Kästeklippen (max. c. 602 m), on the Huthberg, between Oker and Schulenberg, Lower Saxony
 Kahle Klippe (max. 1,011.5 m), on the Westhang of the Brockens, Saxony-Anhalt
 Kanapeeklippe (max. c. 750 m), Auf dem Acker, Lower Saxony
 Kanzelklippe (max. c. 950 m), on the Königsberg, between Wernigerode and Schierke, Saxony-Anhalt
 Kapellenklippe (near c. 910 m), on the Renneckenberg (on the Pferdekopf), between Wernigerode and Schierke, Saxony-Anhalt
 Kattnäse (near c. 580 m), on the Mittelberg, near Bad Harzburg, Lower Saxony
 Kesselklippe (max. c. 975 m), on the Königsberg, between Wernigerode and Schierke, Saxony-Anhalt
 Kleine Teufelsmühle (near c. 577 m), on the Viktorshöhe, near Friedrichsbrunn, Saxony-Anhalt
 Kleine Wurmbergklippe (auch: Kleine Klippe; near c. 690 m) (see below: Wurmbergklippen)
 Kleine Zeterklippe (Untere Zeterklippe; max. c. 827 m), see below: Zeterklippen
 Leistenklippe (near c. 880 m), part of the Hohneklippen of the Hohnekamm, between Wernigerode and Schierke, Saxony-Anhalt
 Luisenklippe (see below: Quitschenbergklippen)
 Margaretenklippen (max. c. 400 m), on the Glockenberg, near Goslar, Lower Saxony
 Mäuseklippe (near c. 660 m), on the Barenberg, near Elend and Schierke, Saxony-Anhalt
 Mausefalle (near c. 550 m), on the Huthberg, between Oker and Schulenberg, Lower Saxony
 Mittlere Zeterklippe (max. c. 866 m), see below: Zeterklippen
 Mönchskappenklippe (max. c. 680 m), Auf dem Acker, Lower Saxony
 Muxklippe (max. c. 550 m), on the Hasselkopf, near Bad Harzburg, Lower Saxony
 Ohrenklippen (max. c. 710 m), on the Hohe Wand, near Wernigerode-Hasserode, Saxony-Anhalt
 Ottofels (max. c. 620 m), between Wernigerode and the Hohnekamm, Saxony-Anhalt
 Paternosterklippe (max. c. 522 m), near the Plessenburg, near Ilsenburg, Saxony-Anhalt
 Pferdediebsklippe (near c. 550 m), on the Hasselkopf, near Bad Harzburg, Lower Saxony
 Präzeptorklippe, in the Rappbode Reservoir, not far from Hasselfelde, Saxony-Anhalt
 Preußischer Saalstein (max. c. 405 m), in the valley of the Kältetalbach, near Bad Suderode, Saxony-Anhalt
 Quitschenbergklippen (max. c. 860 m; including the Luisenklippe), on the Quitschenberg, near Torfhaus, Lower Saxony
 Rabenklippe (max. c. 550 m), on the Kaltetalskopf, near Bad Harzburg, Lower Saxony
 Rabenklippe (max. c. 975 m), on the Königsberg, between Wernigerode and Schierke, Saxony-Anhalt
 Rabenklippen (Große and Kleine Rabenklippe), on the Rappbode Reservoir near Hasselfelde, Saxony-Anhalt
 Ravensklippen (max. c. 490 m), on the Dietrichsberg, near Schulenberg, Saxony-Anhalt
 Roßtrappe (max. 403.0 m), near Thale on the Roßtrappenberg (Bodetal), Saxony-Anhalt
 Rudolfklippe (max. c. 570 m), on the Winterberg, near Bad Harzburg, Lower Saxony
 Sachsenstein (near c. 500 m), on the Sachsenberg, near Bad Harzburg, Lower Saxony
 Sachsensteinsklippen (max. c. 320 m), on the Sachsenstein, between Bad Sachsa and Neuhof, Lower Saxony
 Scharfensteinklippe (max. 697.6 m), on the Scharfenstein (Ilsenburg), near Ilsenburg, Saxony-Anhalt
 Scharfensteinklippe (max. 462.4 m), on the Scharfenstein (Wernigerode), near Wernigerode, Saxony-Anhalt
 Scherstorklippen (max. c. 694 m), on the Barenberg, near Elend and Schierke, Saxony-Anhalt
 Schluftkopfklippe (near c. 805 m), on the Königsberg, between Wernigerode and Schierke, Saxony-Anhalt
 Schnarcherklippen (max. c. 671 m), on the Barenberg, near Elend and Schierke, Saxony-Anhalt
 Seilerklippe (near c. 760 m), Auf dem Acker, Lower Saxony
 Sergeantenklippe (max. c. 680 m), on the Großen Breitenberg, near Riefensbeek, Lower Saxony
 Siebenwochenklippe (max. c. 520 m), on the Ifenkopf, between Altenau and Kon theschlacken, Lower Saxony
 Sösestein (max. c. 730 m), Auf dem Acker, Lower Saxony
 Sommerklippen (max. c. 410 m), in the valley of the Wurmbach, near Stecklenberg, Saxony-Anhalt
 Sophienklippe (max. c. 650 m), Auf dem Acker, Lower Saxony
 Spießerklippe (max. c. 640 m), Auf dem Acker, Lower Saxony
 Stangenklippe (near c. 820 m), on the Königsberg, between Wernigerode and Schierke, Saxony-Anhalt
 Steile Wand (max. c. 780 m), on the Bruchberg, in Richtung Torfhaus, Lower Saxony
 Stollenklippe (max. c. 690 m), Auf dem Acker, Lower Saxony
 Taubenklippe (max. 560.3 m), in the valley of the Ecker, near Ilsenburg, on the Frankenberg, Saxony-Anhalt
 Teufelsmauer (part of the Adlersklippen; max. 331.5 m), on the Heidelberg between Blankenburg and Ballenstedt, Saxony-Anhalt
 Teufelsmühle (siehe oben: Große Teufelsmühle and Kleine Teufelsmühle)
 Tofana (Harz), part of the Adlerklippen near Goslar-Oker in the Okertal, Lower Saxony
 Treppenstein (max. c. 511 m), in the Okertal, on the Huthberg, between Oker and Schulenberg, Lower Saxony
 Trudenstein (near c. 735 m), near Schierke, on the Hohnekopf of the Hohnekamm, Saxony-Anhalt
 Uhlenstein (max 469.1 m), in the valley of the Uhlenbach, Friedrichsbrunn, Saxony-Anhalt
 Uhuklippen (max. c. 390 m), near Goslar-Oker in the Okertal, Lower Saxony
 Viktorsklippen, in the valley of the Kältetalbach, near Bad Suderode, Saxony-Anhalt
 Winterklippen (max. c. 420 m), in the valley of the Wurmbach, near Stecklenberg, Saxony-Anhalt
 Woldsbergklippen (near c. 560 m), on the Woldsberg, near Bad Harzburg, Lower Saxony
 Wolfsklippen (max. c. 640 m), on the Wolfskopf, near Kon theschlacken, Lower Saxony
 Wolfsklippen (c. 710 m), between Drei Annen Hohne and the Plessenburg, Saxony-Anhalt
 Wurmbergklippen (Große and Kleine Wurmbergklippe), on the Wurmberg, near Braunlage, Saxony-Anhalt
 Zeterklippen (max. 929.7 m), on the Renneckenberg, between Wernigerode and Schierke, Saxony-Anhalt

See also 
 List of mountains of the Harz
 Gegensteine, a pair of rock outcrops on the Teufelsmauer in the North Harz Foreland
 Hamburger Wappen, a pair rock outcrop on the Teufelsmauer in the North Harz Foreland

References 

!
Rock formations